Mykhaylo Mykhaylovych Forkash (6 July 1948 – 30 September 2011) was a Ukrainian and Soviet football player.

Honours
 Soviet Top League winner: 1972.

International career
Forkash played his only game for USSR on 6 July 1972 in a friendly against Portugal.

References

External links
Profile 
Biography of Mykhaylo Forkash 

1948 births
2011 deaths
Soviet footballers
Soviet Union international footballers
Ukrainian footballers
FC SKA Rostov-on-Don players
FC Volyn Lutsk players
Soviet Top League players
Sportspeople from Uzhhorod
Association football goalkeepers